Waman P. Bhonsle (19 February 1932 – 26 April 2021) was an Indian film editor, who worked in Hindi cinema from 1960s to 1990s.

At the 25th National Film Awards, he won the Best Editing Award for Inkaar.

Biography
He was born in a small village in Goa called Pomburpa on 19 February 1932. He was the third son born to Pandhary and Krishnabai Bhonsle. He did his early schooling in Goa and came to Mumbai in the year 1952 to complete his primary education.

Career
That year on Bhonsle adopted the city of Mumbai as the land of his destiny. He started his tutorship under the trained eyes of Editor D.N.Pai at Bombay Talkies in 1952. After working as an apprentice with Pai for 6 months, he was asked to work at Filmistan as an assistant editor. Bhonsle honed his skills for 12  years at Filmistan and landed his first big assignment as an Independent Editor for Raj Khosla’s film "Do Raaste" in 1967. He received critical acclaim for his editing technique in this film, and built on this success.

In his career he worked with many important film makers of his times:   Raj Khosla, Gulzaar, Subhash Ghai, Shekar Kapur, Ravi Tandon, Mahesh Bhat, Raj Sippy, Anil Ganguly, Sunil Dutt, Vikram Bhat, Ashok Gaikwad, K. Viswanath. In association with these film makers he edited some blockbuster movies like Mera Gaon Mera Desh, Do Raaste,  Inkaar, Dostana, Ghulam, Agneepath, Parichay, Mausam, Aandhi, Hero, Kalicharan, Karz, Saaheb, Ram Lakhan, Saudagar
 
During the course of his more than 4 decades in the Indian film industry he   helped his assistants progress in their careers. The several awards won over the years stand testimony to his craft, his commitment, his focus on mentoring his people and his unwavering  belief in advancing Indian Cinema through innovative editing techniques (e.g.: The train sequence in Ghulam).

Bhonsle retired in 2002.

Awards and recognition
 National Film Award for Best Editing for Inkaar in 1978
 Filmfare Award for Best Editing for Saudagar in 1992.
 FTII -Pune honor for Contribution to Indian Cinema in 1997
 Lux ZeeCine Award for Best Editing for Ghulam in 1998.
 Mumbai Academy of the Moving Image (MAMI) - Technical Excellence Award in 2003 
 Goa International Film Festival - Honored for Lifetime Achievement award in 2008.
 Bimal Roy Trophy - Lifetime achievement award by Bimal Roy Memorial and Film Society recognizing his 4 decades contribution to film industry.

References

External links
 

1932 births
2021 deaths
Hindi film editors
People from North Goa district
Best Editor National Film Award winners
Filmfare Awards winners
Film editors from Goa